Maja Chwalińska (born 11 October 2001) is a Polish tennis player. She has a career-high ranking of world No. 149, achieved on 3 October 2022, and a best doubles ranking of world No. 175, reached on 1 August 2022. She won her first senior singles title at a ITF Circuit tournament in Bytom in July 2019, having already won four ITF doubles titles up to that point.

Junior career
Junior Grand Slam results - Singles:
 Australian Open: 1R (2017)
 French Open: Q1 (2017)
 Wimbledon: 3R (2017)
 US Open: 1R (2017)

Junior Grand Slam results - Doubles:
 Australian Open: F (2017)
 French Open: 1R (2017)
 Wimbledon: 1R (2017)
 US Open: QF (2017)

She won the European 14-and-under doubles title in 2015, and the 16-and-under doubles title in 2016. She was a member of the Polish team which won the Junior Fed Cup title in 2016, and made the final of the 2017 Australian Open junior doubles before completing a trio of European junior titles by winning the 16-and-under singles title six months later.

Her highest junior Tennis Europe ranking was No. 6 in August 2017, having reached No. 5 in the under-14 rankings in April 2015.

Professional career

2018
Chwalińska's profile received a boost in May when she played in the ITF tournament in Trnava, Slovakia. In her final round qualifying match against Irina Falconi, she produced an amazing "tweener" shot which clipped the top of the net and dropped into Falconi's side of the court for a winner which became an internet sensation. Chwalińska went on to beat Falconi, and then the pair of them became part of a very unusual club when they met again in the first round proper. Chwalińska was originally drawn to meet Carol Zhao, who withdrew through injury and was replaced by Falconi as a lucky loser. In the rematch Chwalińska won again, but was beaten in the second round by Verónica Cepede Royg, a player ranked more than 500 places higher, and who went on to be the tournament runner-up.

A few weeks later she won her second doubles title, in Toruń, Poland, alongside Katarzyna Kawa, who had beaten her in a singles quarterfinal the day before, and her doubles ranking jumped to a career-high 510. She followed that by finishing runner-up in the singles at the European Junior Championship to Clara Tauson, and was a losing semifinalist in the doubles with Weronika Falkowska. In Warsaw, she reached the semifinals of the singles, going down in a marathon three hours and 15 minutes three-set match to Victoria Bosio, and won the doubles with Daria Kuczer, racing away to take the match tie-break 10–1, after losing the first set.

2019
Poland hosted the Europe/Africa I Fed Cup pool at Zielona Góra in February. Chwalińska represented her country at senior level for the first time in the tie against Denmark, where she partnered Alicja Rosolska in the doubles. They beat Maria Jespersen and Hannah Viller Møller, 6–0, 6–3.

She reached the doubles final of the ITF event in Trnava the following week, and the singles semifinals in Altenkirchen a week after that. Moving on to England, she and Ulrikke Eikeri won the doubles title at the ITF tournament in Sunderland, coming from match points down to win the match tie-break 11–9, Chwalińska finishing with an amazing backhand down the line from well outside the court.

Her first singles title followed in July, appropriately enough on home soil in Bytom, where she beat Nina Potočnik in the final. A week later, she made it two singles titles in a row on the Polish swing of the circuit, the runner-up this time being Dejana Radanović, and a week after that she successfully defended her doubles title in Warsaw, the differences from the previous year being that the tournament had now been upgraded to a $60k event and that Eikeri was her partner this time. Her partner from the previous year, Daria Kuczer, was half of the team they defeated in the first round. The following day saw a dream result as she defeated Anastasiya Komardina in the singles final to complete a treble of titles in consecutive weeks.

Her last two tournaments for the year were in Székesfehérvár, but she lost to Irina Bara in the first round both times. She also lost in the first round of doubles in both weeks.

2020
Chwalińska started the new season by travelling to Australia for the first time since 2017, making her senior Grand Slam debut in the Australian Open, where she lost in the first round of qualifying to Isabella Shinikova. At the Fed Cup Group I tournament in Esch-sur-Alzette, Luxembourg, Chwalińska, again partnered Alicja Rosolska in the doubles, this time against Slovenia. Rosolska picked up a slight injury during the match, hampering her enough to ruin their chance of victory. Chwalińska paired with Magdalena Fręch in the following day's win over Turkey. Her only subsequent tournament before the COVID-19 pandemic halted international tennis was at Altenkirchen, where she had to withdraw through injury during her second round singles match. That meant, she and Linda Fruhvirtová had to default their doubles semifinal.

Chwalińska returned to tournament play in August, at the event in Prague which had been upgraded to replace the cancelled US Open qualifying competition. She had easy wins in the first two rounds, but injured her wrist in her third-round loss to Clara Tauson. She resumed by winning a Polish inter-club tournament at the beginning of December, and followed that with an ITF tournament in Selva Gardena. Beaten in the first round of singles by Lea Bošković, she and Linda Fruhvirtová made it to the doubles final, where they lost to Italian 17 year olds Matilde Paoletti and Lisa Pigato, the latter being the French Open junior doubles champion.

2021
Chwalińska again found Clara Tauson to be a stumbling block when she played her first tournament of the year in Fujairah, losing to the Dane in the quarterfinals. She lost to Yuan Yue in the first round of qualifying for the Australian Open in Dubai before reaching the semifinals of a $25k tournament in Grenoble, but aggravated her wrist injury in Altenkirchen the following week and had to withdraw after winning her first match.

She then went to Argentina for a series of $25k tournaments, but contracted COVID-19 and had to return home after quarantining without playing a match.

2022: Grand Slam debut and first win
She qualified for her first major at the 2022 Wimbledon Championships defeating No. 2 seed CoCo Vandeweghe in the final round of qualifying. She won her first major match defeating Kateřina Siniaková in the first round.

Grand Slam performance timelines

Singles

ITF Circuit finals

Singles: 7 (5 titles, 2 runner-ups)

Doubles: 14 (7 titles, 7 runner-ups)

Fed Cup/Billie Jean King Cup participation

Doubles (2–1)

Junior career

Grand Slam finals

Girls' doubles: 1 (runner–up)

ITF Junior Circuit finals

Singles: 2 (2 titles)

Doubles: 7 (1 title, 6 runner-ups)

Other finals

Team competition

Record against top 10 players
Chwalinska's record against players who have been ranked in the top 10, Active players are in boldface.

Notes

References

External links
 
 
 

2001 births
Living people
Polish female tennis players
People from Dąbrowa Górnicza
21st-century Polish women